Amazonsaurus ("Amazon lizard") is a genus of diplodocoid sauropod dinosaur from the Early Cretaceous Period of what is now South America. It would have been a large-bodied quadrupedal herbivore with a long neck and whiplash tail. Although more derived diplodocoids were some of the longest animals ever to exist, Amazonsaurus was probably not more than 12 meters (40 ft) long. Gregory S. Paul estimated in 2010 its weight at 5000 kg.

Fossils of Amazonsaurus, including some back and tail vertebrae, ribs, and fragments of the pelvis, are the only dinosaur remains identifiable at the generic level from the Itapecuru Formation of Maranhão. This geologic formation dates back to the Aptian through Albian epochs of the Early Cretaceous Period, or about 125 to 100 million years ago. Amazonsaurus was recovered in sediments which are interpreted by geologists as floodplain deposits near a river delta.

Description

The tall neural spines on the tail vertebrae identify Amazonsaurus as a diplodocoid sauropod, but the fragmentary nature of the only known specimen makes it difficult to place A. maranhensis more specifically within the superfamily Diplodocoidea. However, some features of these vertebrae suggest it may be a late-surviving member of a line of basal diplodocoids. At least one published cladistic analysis shows Amazonsaurus to be more derived than rebbachisaurids, but still basal to dicraeosaurids and diplodocids within Diplodocoidea (Salgado et al., 2004).

Etymology
Despite the fact that other dinosaurs have been found in Brazil, this is the first named genus from territory in the Amazon Basin. The generic name is derived from the Brazilian Legal Amazon region and the Greek word sauros ("lizard"). There is one named species, (A. maranhensis), which is named after the Brazilian state of Maranhão. Both genus and species were named in 2003 by Brazilian paleontologists Ismar de Souza Carvalho and Leonardo dos Santos Avilla, and their Argentine colleague, Leonardo Salgado.

Biogeography
Basal diplodocoids are found in several parts of South America, as well as northern Africa, during the Early Cretaceous, as are titanosaurian sauropods, and the carcharodontosaurid and spinosaurid theropods. By the Late Cretaceous Period, the diplodocoids had gone extinct, while Angolatitan remained and titanosaurs proliferated. The predatory theropod families of the Early Cretaceous were also replaced by abelisaurid theropods throughout the southern continents during the Late Cretaceous (Carvalho et al., 2003; Novas et al., 2005).

References

Rebbachisaurids
Early Cretaceous dinosaurs of South America
Cretaceous Brazil
Fossils of Brazil
Fossil taxa described in 2003